Colin Evans was an early 20th-century Welsh spiritualist medium who claimed to have the ability to levitate but was discovered to be a fraud.

Levitation

In a flash-illuminated picture taken at a séance in Wortley Hall, Finsbury Park in 1937 Evans can be seen "levitating" in mid-air. He claimed that the spirits had lifted him. Evans was later discovered to be a fraud, as a cord leading from a device in his hand has indicated that it was himself who triggered the flash-photograph and that all he had done was jump from his chair into the air and pretend he had levitated. He performed in complete darkness so that sitters in the séance could not see what he was doing. Magicians have pointed out that Evans's blurred feet in the photographs are proof that he simply jumped high into the air.

In another séance held at North Gate Mansions, Regent's Park in 1938, Evans performed the same trick. The sitters were not happy and he had to return the money to those who had paid him.

References

External links
 Levitation Secret Revealed (70 years ago)

Welsh fraudsters
Welsh spiritual mediums
Year of birth missing
Year of death missing